The Dallas Ballers were a basketball team based in Dallas, Texas. The team competed in the Junior Basketball Association (JBA), a league created for high school and junior college players as an alternative to the National Collegiate Athletic Association (NCAA).

History 
The JBA was first announced on December 20, 2017, when media personality LaVar Ball said to Slam magazine that he would create a professional league targeted at high school graduates and fully funded by his sports apparel company Big Baller Brand. The league held tryouts in Texas in April 2018, selecting a total of 14 players in Dallas and Houston for JBA rosters.

Final roster

References

External links 
JBA official website

Junior Basketball Association teams
Basketball teams in Dallas
Basketball teams established in 2018
2018 establishments in Texas